The Ambassador Apartments is a historic building in downtown Portland, Oregon, United States. Since 1979, it has been on the National Register of Historic Places.

Described as Jacobean, the Ambassador Apartments is unique in Portland for substituting Idaho sandstone instead of the glazed terra-cotta common in the facades and trim of structures dating from the 1920s.

The building has been the residence of many prominent business and professional people, including lumber company owner Louis Gerlinger Sr. during 1929-1940 and William Simon U'Ren during 1927–1949.  Edith Green maintained an office on the ground floor.

Located on prime downtown real estate, the building has now been converted into condominiums. In 1999, the smallest unit available was advertised for $148,000.

See also
Architecture of Portland, Oregon
National Register of Historic Places listings in Southwest Portland, Oregon

References

External links

Bidwell and Co. Building (Emporis)

Residential buildings completed in 1922
Residential condominiums in the United States
Apartment buildings on the National Register of Historic Places in Portland, Oregon
1922 establishments in Oregon
Carl L. Linde buildings
Tudor Revival architecture in Oregon
Southwest Portland, Oregon
Portland Historic Landmarks